Zakharovsky (masculine), Zakharovskaya (feminine), or Zakharovskoye (neuter) is the name of a handful of rural localities in Russia:
Zakharovsky, Ryazan Oblast, a khutor in Narminsky Rural Okrug of Yermishinsky District of Ryazan Oblast
Zakharovsky, Volgograd Oblast, a khutor in Reshetovsky Selsoviet of Alexeyevsky District of Volgograd Oblast
Zakharovskoye, Sverdlovsk Oblast, a selo in Kamyshlovsky District of Sverdlovsk Oblast
Zakharovskoye, Kharovsky District, Vologda Oblast, a village in Kharovsky Selsoviet of Kharovsky District of Vologda Oblast
Zakharovskoye, Ustyuzhensky District, Vologda Oblast, a village in Khripelevsky Selsoviet of Ustyuzhensky District of Vologda Oblast
Zakharovskaya, Belosludsky Selsoviet, Krasnoborsky District, Arkhangelsk Oblast, a village in Belosludsky Selsoviet of Krasnoborsky District of Arkhangelsk Oblast
Zakharovskaya, Permogorsky Selsoviet, Krasnoborsky District, Arkhangelsk Oblast, a village in Permogorsky Selsoviet of Krasnoborsky District of Arkhangelsk Oblast
Zakharovskaya, Rovdinsky Selsoviet, Shenkursky District, Arkhangelsk Oblast, a village in Rovdinsky Selsoviet of Shenkursky District of Arkhangelsk Oblast
Zakharovskaya, Yamskogorsky Selsoviet, Shenkursky District, Arkhangelsk Oblast, a village in Yamskogorsky Selsoviet of Shenkursky District of Arkhangelsk Oblast
Zakharovskaya, Minsky Selsoviet, Ustyansky District, Arkhangelsk Oblast, a village in Minsky Selsoviet of Ustyansky District of Arkhangelsk Oblast
Zakharovskaya, Rostovsky Selsoviet, Ustyansky District, Arkhangelsk Oblast, a village in Rostovsky Selsoviet of Ustyansky District of Arkhangelsk Oblast
Zakharovskaya, Irkutsk Oblast, a farmstead in Bokhansky District of Irkutsk Oblast
Zakharovskaya, Kirov Oblast, a village in Papulovsky Rural Okrug of Luzsky District of Kirov Oblast
Zakharovskaya, Kharovsky District, Vologda Oblast, a village in Kumzersky Selsoviet of Kharovsky District of Vologda Oblast
Zakharovskaya, Syamzhensky District, Vologda Oblast, a village in Dvinitsky Selsoviet of Syamzhensky District of Vologda Oblast
Zakharovskaya, Totemsky District, Vologda Oblast, a village in Vozhbalsky Selsoviet of Totemsky District of Vologda Oblast
Zakharovskaya, Morozovsky Selsoviet, Verkhovazhsky District, Vologda Oblast, a village in Morozovsky Selsoviet of Verkhovazhsky District of Vologda Oblast
Zakharovskaya, Sibirsky Selsoviet, Verkhovazhsky District, Vologda Oblast, a village in Sibirsky Selsoviet of Verkhovazhsky District of Vologda Oblast